Đorđevac is a village in the municipality of Bujanovac, Serbia. According to the 1991 census, the village had a population of 65 people, all Albanians. According to the 2002 census, the village was without inhabitants.

References

Populated places in Pčinja District
Albanian communities in Serbia